Francis Cuthbert "Frank" Futter (c. 1880 – 13 November 1941) was a rugby union player who represented Australia.

Futter, a centre, was born in Cootamundra, New South Wales and claimed one international rugby cap for Australia, playing against Great Britain, at Sydney, on 30 July 1904.

References

Australian rugby union players
Australia international rugby union players
1941 deaths
Year of birth missing
Rugby union players from New South Wales
Rugby union centres